Graciela is a 1956 Argentine film directed by Leopoldo Torre Nilsson, which earned its Chilean star, Lautaro Murúa, the 1957 Silver Condor Award for Best Actor. It was Murúa' debut film in Argentina and his first principal role, which he played opposite, Elsa Daniel.

Cast
 Elsa Daniel
 Lautaro Murúa
 Ilde Pirovano
 Alba Múgica
 Ernesto Bianco
 Alita Román
 Susana Campos
 Diana Ingro
 Frank Nelson
 Alejandro Rey

References

External links 

1956 films
Films directed by Leopoldo Torre Nilsson
1950s Spanish-language films
1950s Argentine films
Argentine drama films
1956 drama films
Argentine black-and-white films